The Association for Women's Rights in Development (AWID), formerly the Association for Women in Development, is an international feminist membership and movement support organization committed to achieving gender equality, sustainable development and women's human rights. It was established in 1982 as a U.S.-based association focused on promoting dialogue on women in development issues among academics, policy makers and development professionals. AWID stands for a progressive intersectional feminism, and works to defend the international and regional human rights systems. The co-executive directors are Hakima Abbas and Cindy Clark.

Activities 

AWID was founded in 1982, toward the end of the United Nations Decade for Women, as a U.S.-based association focused on promoting dialogue on women in development issues among academics, policy makers and development professionals, i.e. staff in the large development organizations.

A dynamic network of women and men around the world, AWID members are researchers, academics, students, educators, activists, business people, policy-makers, development practitioners, funders, and more. The former executive director of AWID was Lydia Alpízar Durán, with Myrna Cunningham Kain as Board President. 

Since 2016 the organization has been led by Hakima Abbas and Cindy Clark as Co-Executive Directors, with American feminist author Charlotte Bunch joining as Board President. Formerly headquartered in Washington, D.C., the organization now has offices in Toronto, Mexico City and Cape Town and staff working across the globe.

A policy brief, Illicit Financial Flows: Why we should claim these resources for gender, economic and social justice, was issued to explain stricter financial regulations which would replace corporate privileges against the people and planet. In that, initial policies to support feminist and gender justice organizations were also recommended to influence relevant decision-making and to involve policy-makers, not limited to mentioning potentially complement bodies as well as those existing engagement and positions.

AWID has received funding from UN Women and its predecessors, several government development agencies and development banks, the Open Society Foundations, the Rockefeller Foundation, the Ford Foundation, the Sigrid Rausing Trust and other organizations.

A notable member is the feminist economist Dame Marilyn Waring, who became involved with the association upon leaving parliament and who served on its board from 2008 to 2012.

Observatory on the Universality of Rights
AWID coordinates the Observatory on the Universality of Rights (OURs), a collaborative project with over 20 other NGOs, that aims "to monitor, analyse, share information and do collaborative advocacy on [...] anti-rights initiatives threatening international and regional human rights systems" from a feminist perspective. OURs' working group includes Planned Parenthood, the World Council of Churches, Muslims for Progressive Values and other organizations.

Focus area 
AWID works on issues of gender justice and women's human rights worldwide through supporting women's rights advocates, organizations and movements, granted by the Channel Foundation since 2011 with initial travel grant program for the "12th AWID International Forum on Women’s Rights and Development: Transforming Economic Power to Advance Women’s Rights and Justice" which was held in Istanbul, Turkey, in April 2012. The organization has been focusing its work around five priority areas: Resourcing Women's Rights, Economic Justice, Challenging Religious Fundamentalism, Women Human Rights Defenders, Young Feminist Activism. The  global membership with over 5000 members consists of both individual and institutional, coming from 164 countries.

AWID supports LGBTIQ rights and opposes the anti-gender movement, and has described trans-exclusionary feminists as "trojan horses in human rights spaces" that seek to undermine human rights; AWID said that anti-trans activity is "alarming," that "the 'sex-based' rhetoric misuses concepts of sex and gender to push a deeply discriminatory agenda" and that "trans-exclusionary feminists (...) undermine progressions on gender and sexuality and protection of rights of marginalized groups."

References

Publications 

 - publication between 1995 and ca.2005

External links

Official site
AWID Young Feminist Wire site

Women's rights organizations
International women's organizations
Organizations established in 1982